Channel South was an Irish television channel, operated by City Channel, transmitting 24-hour local programming to Cork, Limerick, and parts of Kerry, Waterford, Clare and Tipperary since November 2008.

Included in the station's programmes is an evening show called South Tonight presented by local celebrities.

Background
Channel South' is a cable television channel operating in Cork, Limerick, and parts of County Kerry, County Waterford, County Clare and County Tipperary since November 2008, Republic of Ireland. It has received a licence by the Broadcasting Commission of Ireland for cable and MMDS operation, and have secured carriage on the formerly NTL owned digital cable system in Dublin. It follows on from the first attempt at a commercial local television network in Ireland and the first attempt at a commercial cable-only channel in the country by its sister City Channel.

In November 2008 the channel was added to UPC Ireland's electronic programme guide on Channel 107, and programming began on 10 November 2008.

The company, which is headed by former Radio Telefís Éireann (RTÉ) presenter David Harvey, also opened City Channels for Galway and Waterford in 2006, and this channel in time – together with City Channels Dublin and Waterford will have about 85% shared content with the rest being local content with Channel South operating 24 hours a day. Harvey also is a shareholder in independent local radio station Dublin's Country Mix 106.8.

See also
Media of the Republic of Ireland
List of Irish television channels

References

Channel South

External links
Channel South Official Website

Television stations in Ireland
Mass media companies of Ireland
Television channels and stations established in 1998